Stop That Noise is a 1935 Fleischer Studios animated short film starring Betty Boop. Commonly thought to be in public domain, its copyright was renewed in 1958.

Synopsis
A sleepless Betty can't take the noise of the city anymore, and heads out into the country for some peace and quiet. She soon discovers that the country has its own problems, such as noisy ducks and irritable insects. In the end, Betty returns to her apartment and happily falls asleep amidst the sounds of the city.

Availability
 Olive Films released this officially in Betty Boop: The Essential Collection: Volume 3.

References

External links
 Stop That Noise on Youtube
 
 Downloadable cartoon at archive.org (public domain, MPEG4, 11MB)

1935 films
Betty Boop cartoons
1930s American animated films
American black-and-white films
1935 animated films
Paramount Pictures short films
Fleischer Studios short films
Short films directed by Dave Fleischer